Clofenciclan (Chlorphencyclan; Tonquil, Vesitan) is a dopamine-releasing agent developed by Boehringer & Soehne in the 1950s. It proved unpopular as a treatment because of its pronounced stimulant activity.

See also
 Arylcyclohexylamine

References 

Stimulants
Ethers
Chloroarenes
Norepinephrine-dopamine releasing agents
Diethylamino compounds